The Ministry of Foreign Affairs and International Cooperation is the government ministry responsible for representing Cambodia to the international community. The ministry oversees the foreign relations of Cambodia, maintains diplomatic missions in other countries, and provides visa services.

 the Minister of Foreign Affairs was Prak Sokhonn. The ministry offices are in Phnom Penh.

e-Visa system

Presently an e-Visa system has been launched by the Ministry of Foreign Affairs and International Cooperation, which enables visitors to apply for a Cambodia tourist visa online. Instead of applying through the Cambodian Embassy, all that is needed to be done is to complete the online application form and pay with a credit card. After receiving the Visa through email, it should be printed and brought along when traveling to Cambodia. Tourists can apply for an online visa to Cambodia at the official website.

Ministers

This is a list of Ministers of Foreign Affairs and International Cooperation of Cambodia:

See also
 Politics of Cambodia
 Foreign relations of Cambodia

Notes

External links
  Ministry of Foreign Affairs and International Cooperation
 Ministry of Foreign Affairs and International Cooperation - directory of Diplomatic Missions of Cambodia

References

Foreign affairs
Foreign relations of Cambodia
 
Cambodia
Phnom Penh